Taft Middle School is a historic Oklahoma City school. It is listed on the National Register of Historic Places as Taft Junior High School.

At 2901 NW 23rd Street, the school's art deco-style building  was designed by Layton, Hicks & Forsyth and built in 1930. The two-story building includes intricate brickwork, terra cotta, and cast stone adornments as well as friezes. It is constructed of yellow brick.

Royals are the Taft mascot. The school has about 600 students.

Athletics

Women's sports
Basketball
Cheerleading
Cross Country
Soccer
Softball
Track & Field
Volleyball

Men's sports
Baseball
Basketball
Cross Country
Football
Soccer
Volleyball 
Track & Field
Wrestling

References

External links
Taft Middle School website, Oklahoma City Public Schools

1930 establishments in Oklahoma
School buildings on the National Register of Historic Places in Ohio
Educational institutions established in 1930
Public middle schools in Oklahoma
Education in Oklahoma City
Art Deco architecture in Oklahoma
National Register of Historic Places in Oklahoma County, Oklahoma
School buildings completed in 1931